Joseph Wayne Pittman (January 1, 1953 – June 13, 2014) was a backup infielder/outfielder in Major League Baseball who played for the Houston Astros, San Diego Padres and San Francisco Giants in parts of three seasons spanning 1981–1984. He was dubbed 'Shoes'.

Born in Houston, Texas, Pittman was selected by the Astros in the 5th round of the 1975 MLB Draft out of Southern University and A&M College in Baton Rouge, Louisiana. He debuted professionally for their Double-A Columbus Astros club late in the year.

In between, he played winter baseball with the Cardenales de Lara and Navegantes de Magallanes clubs of the Venezuelan League. He then won the Senior Professional Baseball Association championship with the St. Petersburg Pelicans in its 1989 inaugural season.

Following his playing retirement, Pittman coached in the minors and also served as an scout for the Astros organization.

In June 2014, Pittman was working a construction job in Freeport, Texas, when he suddenly collapsed. Immediate attempts to revive him were unsuccessful. He died in Lake Jackson, Texas, at the age of 61.

References

External links

Baseball Gauge

1953 births
2014 deaths
African-American baseball players
Baseball players from Houston
Cardenales de Lara players
Charleston Charlies players
Cocoa Astros players
Columbus Astros players
Houston Astros players
Houston Astros scouts
Las Vegas Stars (baseball) players
Major League Baseball infielders
Major League Baseball outfielders
Minor league baseball coaches
Nashville Sounds players
Navegantes del Magallanes players
American expatriate baseball players in Venezuela
Phoenix Giants players
San Diego Padres players
San Francisco Giants players
Southern Jaguars baseball players
Southern University alumni
St. Petersburg Pelicans players
Tucson Toros players
Winter Haven Super Sox players
20th-century African-American sportspeople
21st-century African-American people